Kalloli is a village in the Kashipur CD block in the Raghunathpur subdivision of the Purulia district in the state of West Bengal, India. It is close to Kashipur.

Geography

Area overview
Purulia district forms the lowest step of the Chota Nagpur Plateau. The general scenario is undulating land with scattered hills. Raghunathpur subdivision occupies the northern part of the district. 83.80% of the population of the subdivision  lives in rural areas. However, there are pockets of urbanization and 16.20% of the population lives in urban areas. There are 14 census towns in the subdivision. It is presented in the map given alongside. There is a coal mining area around Parbelia and two thermal power plants are there – the 500 MW Santaldih Thermal Power Station and the 1200 MW Raghunathpur Thermal Power Station. The subdivision has a rich heritage of old temples, some of them belonging to the 11th century or earlier. The Banda Deul is a monument of national importance. The comparatively more recent in historical terms, Panchkot Raj has interesting and intriguing remains in the area.

Note: The map alongside presents some of the notable locations in the subdivision. All places marked in the map are linked in the larger full screen map.

Demographics
As per 2011 Census of India Kalloli had a total population of 1,524 of which 783 (51%) were males and 741 (49%) were females. Population below 6 years was 164. The total number of literates in Kalloli was 1,076 (79.12% of the population over 6 years).

Civic administration

CD block HQ
The headquarters of the Kashipur CD block are located at Kalloli.

Transport
Kashipur-Chhatna Road passes through Kalloli.

Healthcare
Kalloli Block Primary Health Centre functions with 30 beds.

References

Villages in Purulia district